The 2011 Gent–Wevelgem was the 73rd running of the Gent–Wevelgem cycling race, held on 27 March 2011.

Teams 
As this is a UCI World Tour event, the organisers are obliged to give a place to each of the 18 ProTour teams.  They also invited 7 wild card teams, indicated with an asterisk below. Each of the 25 teams were permitted up to eight riders: 196 riders began the race.

*
*

*

*

*

*

*

Results

References

External links

Gent–Wevelgem
Gent-Wevelgem, 2011
Gent-Wevelgem